Vladimir Raspopov (20 April 1927 – 1999) was a Soviet equestrian. He competed at the 1952 Summer Olympics, the 1956 Summer Olympics and the 1960 Summer Olympics.

References

1927 births
1999 deaths
Soviet male equestrians
Olympic equestrians of the Soviet Union
Equestrians at the 1952 Summer Olympics
Equestrians at the 1956 Summer Olympics
Equestrians at the 1960 Summer Olympics
Place of birth missing
Date of death missing